The Corne de Sorebois is a mountain in the Pennine Alps in Switzerland. It is located near Zinal in Valais. Sorebois is the name of an alpine pasture on the east slopes of the mountain.

See also
List of mountains of Switzerland accessible by public transport

References

External links
 Corne de Sorebois on Summitpost

Mountains of the Alps
Mountains of Switzerland
Mountains of Valais
Two-thousanders of Switzerland